Jean Pierre Noher (born May 5, 1956) is a French-born Argentine actor.

Biography

A great-nephew of director Max Ophüls, Noher was born in Paris, in 1956. He relocated to Argentina as a young man, and debuted on Argentine television with a part in a soap opera, Novia de vacaciones, in 1979. He then began work in the local theatre, and debuted in a local production of Romeo and Juliet, in 1982.

His first film role was in Alejandro Doria's tragedy, Darse cuenta, in 1984, though Noher continued to work mostly in the theatre in subsequent years. Noher's first leading role was as a land developer with a change of heart in Eduardo Spagnuolo's Sin reserva (1997), and in 2000, he was cast as writer Jorge Luis Borges in Javier Torre's fact-based Un amor de Borges;  the role secured him awards at the Gramado Film Festival, Miami International Film Festival, and the Biarritz International Festival of Latin American Cinema.

Noher played Ernesto Guevara Lynch, the father of Che Guevara in the opening scenes of Walter Salles' The Motorcycle Diaries (2004). Remaining active in the theatre, he worked with two veteran actors as directors: China Zorrilla and Victor Laplace, who in 2010 reprised his film role as populist leader Juan Perón opposite Noher's Borges (an opponent of Perón) in Borges y Perón.

Noher's son, Michel Noher, born in Buenos Aires in 1983, has starred in Alejandro Doria's biopic, Las manos (2006), and in Francis Ford Coppola's 2009 feature, Tetro.

Filmography

References

External links
 

1956 births
Living people
Male actors from Paris
French emigrants to Argentina
20th-century Argentine male actors
21st-century Argentine male actors
Naturalized citizens of Argentina